The 1994–95 FA Cup Qualifying Rounds opened the 114th season of competition in England for 'The Football Association Challenge Cup' (FA Cup), the world's oldest association football single knockout competition.    A total of 557 clubs were accepted for the competition, up 18 from the previous season’s 539.

The large number of clubs entering the tournament from lower down (Levels 5 through 8) in the English football pyramid meant that the competition started with five rounds of preliminary (1) and qualifying (4) knockouts for these non-League teams.  The 28 winning teams from Fourth Round Qualifying progressed to the First Round Proper, where League teams tiered at Levels 3 and 4 entered the competition.

Calendar

Preliminary round

Ties

Replays

2nd replays

1st qualifying round

Ties

Replays

2nd replays

2nd qualifying round

Ties

Replays

2nd replays

3rd replay

3rd qualifying round

Ties

Replays

2nd replays

4th qualifying round
The teams that given byes to this round are Kettering Town, Southport, Macclesfield Town, Stafford Rangers, Altrincham, Halifax Town, Stalybridge Celtic, Bromsgrove Rovers, Yeovil Town, Farnborough Town, Slough Town, Witton Albion, Sutton United, Crawley Town, Marlow, Cheltenham Town, Accrington Stanley, Marine, V S Rugby and Nuneaton Borough.

Ties

Replays

1994-95 FA Cup
See 1994-95 FA Cup for details of the rounds from the First Round Proper onwards.

External links
 Football Club History Database: FA Cup 1994-95
 The FA Cup Archive

Qual
FA Cup qualifying rounds